Evander Philip Yarangga (born 2 July 1997) is an Indonesian professional footballer who plays as a centre-back for Liga 2 club PSBS Biak.

Club career

Persela Lamongan
He was signed for Persela Lamongan to play in Liga 1 in the 2019 season. Yarangga made his league debut on 25 August 2019 in a match against TIRA-Persikabo at the Surajaya Stadium, Lamongan.

Persewar Waropen
Yarangga joined the Persewar Waropen club in the 2020 Liga 2. This season was suspended on 27 March 2020 due to the COVID-19 pandemic. The season was abandoned and was declared void on 20 January 2021.

PSBS Biak
In 2021, Yarangga signed a contract with Indonesian Liga 2 club PSBS Biak. He made his league debut on 7 October 2021 against Mitra Kukar at the Tuah Pahoe Stadium, Palangka Raya.

References

External links 
 Evander Yarangga at Soccerway
 Evander Yarangga at Liga Indonesia

1999 births
Living people
Indonesian footballers
Liga 2 (Indonesia) players
Liga 1 (Indonesia) players
Persewar Waropen players
Persela Lamongan players
People from Biak
Association football central defenders
Sportspeople from Papua